Wulfgar, Wolfgar and Wolfger are variants of an Old High German masculine given name meaning "wolf-spear". They may refer to:

Historical 
Wolfgar (bishop of Würzburg), a 9th-century bishop
Wolfger von Erla, a 12th-century bishop
Wulfgar of Abingdon, a 10th-century abbot
Wulfgar of Lichfield, a mid 10th century bishop
Wolfger of Prüfening, a 12th-century monk and historian
Wulfgar of Ramsbury, a medieval bishop

Fictional 
Wulfgar (Forgotten Realms), one of the Companions of the Hall from the Icewind Dale Trilogy
Wulfgar, the herald of Hroðgar, a character in Beowulf
Wulfgar, the villain in the 1981 Sylvester Stallone film Nighthawks
Wulfgar, one of the Greybeards in The Elder Scrolls V: Skyrim

References